West Ashley High School is the only public high school located in the West Ashley area in Charleston, South Carolina, United States. It was created in 2000, when the Charleston County School District merged Middleton High School and Saint Andrews High School. It is a part of St. Andrews Constituent District #10.

Notable events 
On July 29, 2002, President George W. Bush visited West Ashley High School to speak about welfare reforms and other topics.

Athletics 
West Ashley competes in Class 5A of the SCHSL. Their main rivals are the Wando High School Warriors and the James Island Charter High School Trojans.

 Fall sports: football, volleyball, girls' tennis, cross-country, swimming
 Winter sports: basketball, wrestling
 Spring sports: soccer, track and field, lacrosse, boys' tennis, baseball, softball

Volleyball 
West Ashley High School's volleyball team established one of the best programs in the state. During the 2005 season the Lady Wildcats were crowned State Champions, and the following year the Wildcats were runners-up, falling to Hillcrest High School. The team is coached by Christy Jickling, a former professional Canadian volleyball player, the wife of former ECHL South Carolina Stingrays player Mike, one of numerous former Stingrays to have settled in Charleston after their playing careers ended.

 Region Champions: 2004, 2005, 2006, 2007, 2008
 Lower-State Champions (State Runners-Up): 2006
 State Champions: 2005

Girls' soccer
 State Champions: 2002, 2003, 2005
 Lower State Runners-Up: 2004, 2006, 2012

Notable alumni

 Tre McLean (born 1993), basketball player in the Israeli Basketball Premier League

References

External links 
 West Ashley High School official site

Public high schools in South Carolina
Schools in Charleston County, South Carolina